07102010 is the first compilation album by American metalcore band Crown the Empire. The album was released on July 10, 2020 through Rise Records. It was produced by Josh Strock and Munk. The album is a compilation of acoustic versions of songs from their previous discography, made to commemorate the 10-year anniversary of the post-hardcore band's first show at Compass Church in Colleyville, Texas.

Background and recording
The album includes a new track, "Everything Breaks", which was written during the Sudden Sky album sessions, recorded as a demo at that time, and released by singer Andy Leo in 2018. When asked about the inspiration for the acoustic album, the band states that they "wanted to look back and strip down songs across all of [their] albums as a thank you to everyone who has been along for the journey so far."

Release and promotion
The album was released on July 10, 2020, through Rise Records, within only two days of being announced. It was initially released only for streaming platforms and as a digital download. It was then released in vinyl format for Record Store Day (November 27, 2020).

Eight of the acoustic tracks from the album were played on a Twitch livestream on July 18, 2020.

Critical reception

The German webzine BurnYourEars gave the album a rating of 7/10. The album is described as having a colorful mix of songs and being nostalgic in tone. Although the songs are stripped down from their aggressive metal origins, they're still just as energetic and emotional, and the dark lyrics stand out in the acoustic format. Although the album is described as not seeming superfluous or boring, the bonus track ("Everything Breaks") is said to be melancholic but without quite providing the desired climax.

The album was also reviewed by Dead Press! on July 13, 2020. In the review, the album is described as "neutral-toned and awash with maturity" but "alive with a new spirit and indicative of [Crown the Empire]'s fondness of what they have created thus far." The album is praised as being tasteful, delicate, and cozy, and the choice of songs is called meticulous and solemn. The band is described as "thriving in both the depths of metalcore and the crisp vulnerability of acoustic tracks" as "a sign of true versatility." The review, however, cautions that it "brings little new to the table" despite being so pleasing to listen to.

Track listing

Notes
 All track titles are stylized in lowercase.

Personnel
Credits adapted from AllMusic.

Crown the Empire
 Andrew "Andy Leo" Rockhold – lead vocals, keyboards, programming, composition
 Brandon Hoover – guitars, vocals, composition
 Hayden Tree – bass, vocals, composition
 Brent Taddie – drums, percussion, composition

Additional personnel
 Josh A. Strock – production, arranging, composition
 Munk – production, engineering
 Kris Crummett and Drew Sullivan – engineering
 Drew Fulk and Scott C. Stevens – arranging, composition
 Stevie Aiello, Brendan K. Barone, David Escamilla, Andrew C. Fulk, Micah Rayan Premnath, Frederik Thaae and Bennett Vogelman – composition

References

External links
 Crown the Empire – Official Site

Crown the Empire albums
2020 albums
Rise Records albums